In the Name of the People can refer to:

 In the Name of the People (1939 film), a German film
 In the Name of the People (1974 film), a German documentary film
 In the Name of the People (1985 film), an American documentary film
 In the Name of the People (2000 film), an American television film
 In the Name of the People (TV series), a 2017 Chinese television series